Anne-Marie Bigot de Cornuel (1605–1694) was a French salonnière. After having been widowed in 1650, she established a famed literary salon in Paris. She was known for her witty remarks and was often quoted.

References

  Reid, Joyce M.H.; Poggi, Luciano (2002). Diccionario de la literatura francesa. Gremese.

1605 births
1694 deaths
French salon-holders